On Thin Ice is a 1925 American silent crime drama film directed by Mal St. Clair and starring Tom Moore, Edith Roberts, and William Russell. It was produced and distributed by the Warner Bros. and based upon a 1924 novel by Alice Ross Colver.

Plot
As described in a film magazine review, Rose (Roberts), desperately in need of money, finds a bag of money thrown over a fence by crooks. She rushes home with it only to find her father has died. She attempts to return the satchel but it is filled with paper and worthless money. The crooks become friendly with her, and although harassed by the police, she finally wins over one of them into going straight.

Cast

Preservation
With no prints of On Thin Ice located in any film archives, it is a lost film.

References

External links

1925 films
American silent feature films
Warner Bros. films
Lost American films
Films directed by Malcolm St. Clair
American black-and-white films
American crime drama films
1925 crime drama films
1925 lost films
Lost crime drama films
1920s American films
Silent American drama films